Sviatlana Makshtarava ( or Svetlana Makshtarova; born 26 July 1994) is a Belarusian-Azerbaijani individual and synchronised trampoline gymnast, representing her nation at international competitions.

Career
She was born in Belarus, she currently lives in Baku, Azerbaijan.
According to EC decision she changed of nationality from Belarusian to Azerbaijani in May 2014. She is entitled to represent Azerbaijan one year after she has obtained Azerbaijani passport. That is to say in May 2015. 

She competed at world championships, including at the 2011, 2013 and 2015 Trampoline World Championships. She participated at the 2015 European Games in Baku.

She Silver medal YOG 2010 [Singapore], Gold medal and bronze medal European Championship [2012 St. Petersburg ], Russia. She bronze medal The world Championship [2014 Varna], Bulgaria. Makshtarova won the silver medal in Women's Synchro at  The World Games 2017 in Wrocław, Poland.

References

External links
 vestnikkavkaza.net
 eurasiadiary
 azernews
 
 YouTube
 

1994 births
Living people
Place of birth missing (living people)
Azerbaijani female trampolinists
Belarusian female trampolinists
Gymnasts at the 2015 European Games
European Games competitors for Azerbaijan
Gymnasts at the 2010 Summer Youth Olympics
Medalists at the Trampoline Gymnastics World Championships
World Games silver medalists
Competitors at the 2017 World Games